Lewis Jones (28 December 1897 – 27 January 1939) was a writer and left-wing political activist, born in Clydach Vale in industrialised South Wales.

Although his novels are more studied by academics now than by general readers, Jones occupies an honourable place in the history of left-wing politics in Britain, and in the ranks of socialist writers. Like many young activists of his generation he attended the Central Labour College in London from 1923–25, where he joined the Communist Party of Great Britain. During the 1926 General Strike he was imprisoned for three months in Swansea Prison for his trade union activities in the Nottinghamshire coalfield.

Once back at the pits, he became chairman and then checkweighman of the Cambrian Lodge of the South Wales Miners Federation. Although often seen as a lesser post to that of Lodge Chairman, in a time of industrial unrest the checkweighman was a vital part of the miners' protection against employers using piece work rules to drive down wages, and it was a role in which Jones was likely to routinely come into conflict with management.

In 1929, he resigned, refusing to work with 'scab' (non-unionised) labour. He remained unemployed for the rest of his life, although, he was likely to be permanently busy on political business. He was extremely popular amongst the rank-and-file Party members, but his association with "Hornerism" (Communists working within established trades unions), his turbulent private life and his distrust of the cult of personality (he was sent home from the Soviet Union for ignoring a standing ovation to Joseph Stalin) meant that he was repeatedly suspended and disciplined by the Party. As the Welsh organiser for the National Unemployed Workers Movement, widely regarded as a Communist front, he led the 1932, 1934 and 1936 hunger marches to London. Also in 1936, he was elected as one of the two Communist members on to the Glamorgan County Council. In South Wales at this time his attachment to the Communist Party would not have harmed his reputation as a political activist and leader.

Lewis Jones died on 27 January 1939 at the end of a day in which he addressed over 30 meetings in support of the republican side of the Spanish Civil War. He is buried at Trealaw Cemetery in Trealaw.

His books provide a description of life in a Welsh mining community of their time; there is an awareness of the crisis of masculinity that mass unemployment brought home to those communities, and the description of workers in struggle with their employers is unflinching in its acknowledgement of defeat as well as victory.

Further reading
By Lewis Jones:
Cwmardy (1937)
We Live (1939)

On Lewis Jones:
Lewis Jones, Dai Smith (1982)

Bibliography

References

1897 births
1939 deaths
Members of Glamorgan County Council
Communist Party of Great Britain councillors
Marxist writers
Communist writers
People from Clydach Vale
Welsh communists
Welsh novelists
20th-century Welsh writers
20th-century British writers
20th-century Welsh novelists
20th-century British novelists
20th-century Welsh politicians
20th-century British politicians